Tirasiana is a genus of disc-shaped animals from the  Ediacaran period that contains three species: T. concentralis, T. coniformis and T. disciformis, all which are distinguished by the complexity of their stepped structure.

Affinity

Tirasiana moulds are thought to be discoidal body fossils of some kind, showing radial symmetry in them and with a round nodule in the middle.

See also

 List of ediacaran genera

 Aspidella

References

Cnidarians
Fossil taxa described in 1976
Ediacaran life
Ediacaran
Enigmatic prehistoric animal genera
Aquatic animals